Phi Chi is one of the oldest and largest international medical fraternities of its kind in the world. Phi Chi evolved from the merging of two professional medical fraternities bearing the same name. Phi Chi Society (Phi Chi East) was founded on March 31, 1889, at the University of Vermont, Burlington, Vt. Phi Chi Medical Fraternity (Phi Chi South) was founded on October 26, 1894, at the Louisville Medical College, Louisville, Ky. These two organizations did not know that they shared a similar name when they were founded. On March 5, 1905, in Burlington, Vt., Phi Chi Society and Phi Chi Medical Fraternity, Inc., were consolidated taking the name Phi Chi Medical Fraternity, Inc.

Phi Chi has grown to become a co-ed, international, professional medical fraternity with chapters in 5 countries.

History

Phi Chi Society of the East

Phi Chi Medical Fraternity of the South

“October 26, 1894, at four o’clock, p.m., there assembled in the office of Doctor Clinton Kelly” of the faculty of the Louisville Medical College, “A. Harris Kelly, Samuel T. McClung, G. Fowler Border, Joseph N. Powers, George E. Gavin, Charles W. Hibbitt, and Linn L. Kennedy (all of whom became members of Alpha of the Southern Fraternity; now Alpha Alpha) for the purpose of organizing a fraternity.”

The growth of Phi Chi is a great monument to the spirit that urged the original group to unite and form a medical fraternity in a city where little was known of such societies. The first members of the Southern Fraternity consisted of the previously mentioned as well as Carey A. Gray and Walker B. Gossett.

On November 5, 1894, a committee was appointed to draft a constitution and not until November 17, was the first officers elected: Presiding Senior, McClung; Presiding Junior, Gossett; Secretary, Kennedy, and Powers, Treasurer (Judge Advocate and the minor officers had not been provided for). Wedding, Chapman and Shacklett were elected to membership and included with Gossett and Gray in the charter listing of members. The First Regular Meeting was held on Saturday, December 8, 1894. On December 29, 1894, D.A. Garrison, O. K. Harris, E. Rea Norris and A.P. Campbell were to complete the charter members.

Beta and Gamma chapters are installed in December 1896.

On February 26, 1897, the first Grand Chapter Convention of Southern Phi Chi Chapters (A, B, Γ, Δ) is called; this date later becomes Founder’s Day.

In 1898, Phi Chi expands out of the Louisville, KY.

The first volume of The Phi Chi Quarterly, the name of the official fraternal publication, is published on April 1, 1904 (the name is changed to The Phi Chi Chronicles in 1989).

Phi Chi Medical Fraternity

On March 5, 1905, Phi Chi Medical Fraternity (Southern Phi Chi) and Phi Chi Society (Eastern Phi Chi) are joined in Baltimore, MD, making Phi Chi the largest medical fraternity in America. Chapter names which conflicted during the joining were resolved by allowing the older chapter to retain its single name and the second chapter to have its name duplicated (Alpha, University of Vermont, 1889; Alpha Alpha, Louisville Medical College, 1894).

On July 1, 1910, the first history of Phi Chi is published. In 1915 the first Phi Chi Directory is published with 37 active chapter (some chapters had been consolidated) and 6,790 initiated members.

1922 saw the merger of Pi Mu Honor Society and Phi Chi as well as the chartering of Beta Mu Chapter at McGill University, Phi Chi’s first Canadian Chapter, on May 15.

December 1925, 24th Grand Chapter Convention is held in Montreal, Quebec, Canada. There are 54 chapters and 12,169 members.

In 1927, the Student Loan Fund was created which was run by the Welfare Association after its creation in 1947, to provide emergency loans for members in need.

On February 21, 1948, Phi Alpha Gamma and Phi Chi merge.

In 1949, the Phi Chi Welfare Association is incorporated. On August 20, Irvin Abell, the first Grand Presiding Senior of Phi Chi, dies.

Eden J. Carey, MD, Memorial Award in Anatomy plaques are created in May 1950.

February 26, 1960, Omega Chapter of Phi Chi is chartered at National Autonomous University of Mexico, Mexico City, the first chapter south of the border. The Michael J. Carey, MD, Senior Service Award is first presented.

May 21, 1962, ΥΒ Chapter of Phi Chi is chartered at University of Puerto Rico, San Juan, PR.

At the XL Grand Chapter Convention in 1973, women medical students are allowed membership.

September 1989, AA and AB Alumni Chapters are chartered.

Sigma Chi Mu Chapter is chartered on October 19, 2001, at American University of the Caribbean, St. Maarten, Netherlands Antilles, making it the first Caribbean chapter.

August 4, 2002, Sigma Tau Chi chapter of St. Christopher College of Medicine in Luton, England is chartered making it the first European chapter of Phi Chi.

On June 12, 2018, Delta Kappa Chapter at Saint James School of Medicine in Anguilla was chartered.

Chapters

USA
Omicron - Tulane University of Louisiana School of Medicine, New Orleans;
Chartered- December 20, 1902

Zeta - University of Texas Medical Branch School of Medicine, Galveston;
Chartered- April 29, 1903

Chi - Jefferson Medical College, Philadelphia;
Chartered- December 9, 1903

Psi - University of Michigan Medical School, Ann Arbor;
Chartered- December 16, 1905

Alpha Beta - The University of Tennessee College of Medicine, Memphis;
Chartered- April 4, 1914 

Chi Upsilon - Creighton University School of Medicine, Omaha;
Chartered- January 15, 1916

Upsilon Nu - University of Nebraska Medical School, Omaha;
Chartered- November 1, 1916

Kappa Chi - University of Minnesota Medical School, Minneapolis;
Chartered- May 22, 1920

Sigma Kappa – Medical University of South Carolina College of Medicine, Charleston;
Chartered- June 2, 1927 

Epsilon Kappa - University of Washington School of Medicine, Seattle;
Chartered- February 26, 1948

Rho Epsilon Omega - Philadelphia College of Osteopathic Medicine, Georgia campus, Suwanee, Georgia;
Chartered- October 22, 2015

International

Sigma Chi Mu - American University of the Caribbean, Cupecoy, St. Maarten, Netherlands Antilles;
Chartered- October 19, 2001

Alpha Tau- Saint James School of Medicine, Arnos Vale, St. Vincent and the Grenadines;
Chartered- June 18, 2016

Delta Kappa - Saint James School of Medicine, Anguilla;
Chartered- June 12, 2018

Chapter order 

Phi Chi East was founded in 1889. Phi Chi South was formed in 1894. When the two fraternities combined in 1905, it was decided that when the name of any two chapters conflicted, the chapter with precedence would retain the single letter and the chapter following shall duplicate its name, such as alpha (1889), University of Vermont, and alpha of Louisville (1894), which became "alpha alpha."

Notable members

References

Other professional medical fraternities
In addition to the medical fraternities listed here, there are numerous chiropractic, pre-health, pharmacy and nursing fraternities.
 Alpha Delta Theta, medical technology
 Alpha Gamma Kappa
 Alpha Kappa Kappa
 Alpha Phi Sigma, see Phi Delta Epsilon 
 Alpha Tau Sigma, Osteopathic, dormant
 Mu Sigma Phi, Philippines
 Nu Sigma Nu
 Omega Tau Sigma, veterinary medicine
 Omega Upsilon Phi, see Phi Beta Pi
 Phi Alpha Gamma, formerly Homeopathic, see Phi Chi
 Phi Beta Pi
 Phi Delta Epsilon
 Phi Kappa Mu, Philippines
 Phi Lambda Kappa
 Phi Rho Sigma
 Sigma Mu Delta, pre-medical
 Theta Kappa Psi

External links
 Phi Chi Medical Fraternity, Inc. National Page
 Phi Chi Medical Fraternity, Chi Chapter Website

See also
 List of medical schools in the United States

 
International student societies
Fraternities and sororities in the United States
Professional medical fraternities and sororities in the United States
Fraternities and sororities in Canada
1889 establishments in Vermont
1894 establishments in Kentucky
1905 establishments in the United States
Student organizations established in 1889
Medical associations based in the United States
Former members of Professional Fraternity Association